Christine Adjahi Gnimagnon (born 1945) is an author from Benin.

Christine Adjahi was born in 1945 in Zounzonmey, a small village of Abomey, Bénin.

Publications
Do Massé: Contes fons du Bénin. Paris: L'Harmattan, 2002. (124p.). .
Le Forgeron magicien. Paris: L'Harmattan, 2008. (62p.). .

References

Beninese women writers
1945 births
Living people